G. africana may refer to:
 Gastrodia africana, an orchid species endemic to Cameroon
 Griffiniella africana, a cockroach species
 Gynacantha africana, a dragonfly species

See also
 Africana (disambiguation)